Per-Olov Löwdin (October 28, 1916 – October 6, 2000) was a Swedish physicist, professor at the University of Uppsala from 1960 to 1983, and in parallel at the University of Florida until 1993.

A former graduate student under Ivar Waller, Löwdin formulated in 1950 the symmetric orthogonalization scheme for atomic and molecular orbital calculations, greatly simplifying the tight-binding method. This scheme is the basis of the zero-differential overlap (ZDO) approximation used in semiempirical theories. In 1956 he introduced the canonical orthogonalization scheme, which is optimal for eliminating approximate linear dependencies of a basis set. These orthogonalization procedures are widely used today in all modern quantum chemistry calculations.

He is also credited with the use of fat symbols for matrices, making easy the derivation of several theorems of quantum mechanics.

The famous 'Löwdin's pairing theorem' used in restricted open-shell Hartree–Fock (ROHF), unrestricted Hartree–Fock (UHF) and generalized valence bond (RES-GVB) theories is not his. According to himself, George G. Hall and King made the formal proposition after an informal suggestion by Löwdin.

His Löwdin partitioning technique for quantum chemistry problems is best appreciated through the series of 14 papers on perturbation theory published between 1963 and 1971.

He was also a very active teacher, starting the Summer Schools of Quantum Chemistry at Uppsala around 1958. In 1959 and 1960, Löwdin started the Quantum Theory Project at the University of Florida as a sister project to the Uppsala Quantum Chemistry Group. In 1964 he was joined by John C. Slater from MIT. The International Winter Institutes (held initially at Sanibel Island, and later at Gainesville) provided the initiation of hundreds of Latin American young scientists during the eighties and nineties. In 1960 he founded the Sanibel Symposium in conjunction with the Winter Institute. They have been held every year since 1960.

Löwdin was elected a member of the Royal Swedish Academy of Sciences in 1969, the American Philosophical Society in 1983, and was a member of the committee for the Nobel Prize in Physics from 1972 to 1984. He was the founder of the International Journal of Quantum Chemistry and of the series Advances in Quantum Chemistry. He was a foundation member of the International Academy of Quantum Molecular Science.

Publications

References

External links 
 
 
 Kimio Ohno Early Ideas in the history of Quantum Chemistry (1976)

 The Löwdin Lectures, Uppsala University
 Quantum Theory Project founded by Löwdin at the University of Florida in 1960

Swedish physicists
1916 births
2000 deaths
University of Florida faculty
Academic staff of Uppsala University
Members of the International Academy of Quantum Molecular Science
Theoretical chemists
Members of the Royal Swedish Academy of Sciences
Fellows of the American Physical Society
Members of the American Philosophical Society